Los Álamos is a Chilean commune and city in Arauco Province, Biobío Region.

Demographics
Of these, 16,394 (88%) lived in urban areas and 2,238 (12%) in rural areas. Between the 1992 and 2002 censuses, the population grew by 10.4% (1,762 persons).

The commune includes the locality of Antihuala.

Administration
As a commune, Los Álamos is a third-level administrative division of Chile administered by a municipal council, headed by an alcalde who is directly elected every four years. The 2008-2012 alcalde is Lautaro Melita Vinett (PS). Since 2013 and until the present the alcalde of Los Álamos is Jorge Fuentes Fetis

Within the electoral divisions of Chile, Los Álamos is represented in the Chamber of Deputies by Manuel Monsalve (PS) and Iván Norambuena (UDI) as part of the 46th electoral district, together with Lota, Lebu, Arauco, Curanilahue, Cañete, Contulmo and Tirúa. The commune is represented in the Senate by Victor Pérez Varela (UDI) and Mariano Ruiz-Esquide Jara (PDC) as part of the 13th senatorial constituency (Biobío-Coast).

Culture 
In the literary field, Los Álamos stands out for its poets. Among these, one can name René Briones Sandoval, Maribel Castro Vergara, Olga Ester Garrido, Marta Díaz Pereira, María Rocha, Manuel Castro, Mac Karo, who were anthologized in the magazine Chonchón n°39, published in September 2020. In addition, During the years 2018 and 2019, the poets of Los Álamos participated in the I and II Latin American Meeting of Poets and Narrators in Lebu, events that included the presence of authors from the Province of Arauco, such as Lidia Mansilla Valenzuela and Alejandro Concha M., and from abroad, such as Jorge Canales and Amapola, from El Salvador, Chary Gumeta and José Baroja, from Mexico, and Felicidad Batista, from Spain, among other participants.

References

External links
  Municipality of Los Álamos

Communes of Chile
Populated places in Arauco Province